One of the Lonely Ones is a posthumous Roy Orbison album which was released on December 4, 2015. It is his 24th and final studio album. Orbison recorded it in 1969. The album, which Orbison recorded surreptitiously in the aftermath of his wife Claudette's death in a motorcycle accident and the death of his two sons in a house fire 2 years later, was long believed lost.

History

In the summer of 1968, Roy Orbison was touring the UK when he met his second wife Barbara Orbison at a nightclub in Leeds. On September 15, 1968, he got the news that his home had burned down and his two eldest sons had died. He took a break for the rest of 1968. On January 21, 1969, Orbison went into the studio to record an album related to the tragedy. After the death of his sons, he went into exile when he was scheduled to be promoting his then current album, Roy Orbison's Many Moods which was delayed to May 1969. Orbison recorded until March 19 so he could tour. After the tour was completed in July, he went back into the studio to record and finished this album on August 2nd. Because of contract disputes, MGM Records shelved One of the Lonely Ones, and it had remained unreleased and unheard until 2015. The album was thought to have been lost forever, but was discovered by Orbison's family.

Track listing

Charts

References

2015 albums
Roy Orbison albums
Universal Music Group albums
Albums published posthumously